The 2016–17 ECHL season was the 29th season of the ECHL. The regular season schedule ran from October 14, 2016 to April 9, 2017, with the Kelly Cup playoffs following. Twenty-seven teams in 21 states and one Canadian province each played a 72-game schedule.

League business

Team changes 
The Evansville IceMen voluntarily suspended operations for the 2016–17 season. The IceMen franchise was approved for relocation to Owensboro, Kentucky, following arena issues in Evansville but would have needed at least a year to finish renovations to the Owensboro Sportscenter. However, the IceMen's deal to move into the Sportscenter fell through in September 2016. In January 2017, various media sources reported that the franchise had been sold to an ownership group based out of Jacksonville, Florida, and was approved by the league on February 8. The team returned in 2017–18 as the Jacksonville Icemen.

Conference realignment 
The ECHL returned to a four division alignment for the 2016–17 season with the removal of the East and Midwest Divisions. Two teams, the Kalamazoo Wings and Toledo Walleye, were moved from the Eastern to the Western Conference and the Cincinnati Cyclones were moved to the Eastern Conference. The West Division was also renamed the Mountain Division while adding the Allen Americans and Missouri Mavericks. The Central Division added the Fort Wayne Komets, Indy Fuel, Kalamazoo Wings, Quad City Mallards, and Toledo Walleye. The South Division added Cincinnati and the Norfolk Admirals. The North Division added the former East Division, except Norfolk.

Due to the season schedule being set in May 2016 and the realignment announced after the July Board of Governors meetings, the new alignment had several divisional scheduling oddities. One of the most egregious examples being Cincinnati having more games against Western Conference teams than in their own Eastern Conference and would not even play inter-divisional members Florida, Norfolk, and Orlando during the regular season.

Affiliation changes

Annual Board of Governors meeting
The annual ECHL Board of Governors meeting was held at the Monte Carlo Resort and Casino in Las Vegas, Nevada, in July 2016. The ECHL Board of Governors unanimously re-elected Cincinnati Cyclones' president Ray Harris as chairman for a second season. The Board also approved of the rule change for no timeouts allowed following an icing penalty, a rule that had also been approved by the American Hockey League.

All-star game
The 2017 CCM/ECHL All-Star Classic was held on January 18, 2017, at the Glens Falls Civic Center in Glens Falls, New York. The event featured the ECHL All-Stars playing against the host Adirondack Thunder. The format for the match consisted of two 25-minute halves with a skills competition during the intermission. The skills competition had a fastest skater, a hardest shot, and a puck skills relay. The first half of the game was played under the standard 5-on-5 player rules while the second half was ten minutes of 5-on-5, five minutes of 4-on-4, and finished with 3-on-3 player hockey. Both goals scored during play and points made during the skills competition counted towards the final score of All-Star Classic.

The ECHL All Stars defeated the Thunder 8–7. Matt Garbowsky of the Colorado Eagles was named the All-star game Most Valuable Player. Steven McParland of the South Carolina Stingrays won the fastest skater competition. Stepan Falkovsky of the Adirondack Thunder won the hardest shot competition with a shot measuring at 99 miles per hour. The Adirondack Thunder won the puck relay competition.

Standings

Final standings.

Eastern Conference

Western Conference

 – clinched playoff spot,  – clinched regular season division title,  – Brabham Cup (regular season) champion

Postseason

2017 Kelly Cup playoffs format
At the end of the regular season the top four teams in each division qualifies for the 2017 Kelly Cup playoffs and be seeded one through four based on highest point total earned in the season. Then the first two rounds of the playoffs are held within the division with the first seed facing the fourth seed and the second seed facing the third. The division champions then play each other in a conference championship. The Kelly Cup finals pits the Eastern Conference champion against the Western Conference champion.  All four rounds are a best-of-seven format.

Bracket

Awards

All-ECHL teams
All-First Team
Riley Gill (G) – Allen Americans
David Makowski (D) – Allen Americans
Matt Register (D) – Colorado Eagles
Chad Costello (F) – Allen Americans
Matt Garbowsky (F) – Colorado Eagles
Casey Pierro-Zabotel (F) – Colorado Eagles

All-Second Team
Jake Paterson (G) – Toledo Walleye
Jake Marto (D) – Colorado Eagles
Kevin Schulze (D) – Wheeling Nailers
Shane Berschbach (F) – Toledo Walleye
Brendan O'Donnell (F) – Florida Everblades
David Vallorani (F) – Brampton Beast

All-Rookie Team
Landon Bow (G) – Idaho Steelheads
Kevin Schulze (D) – Wheeling Nailers
Nolan Zajac (D) – Toledo Walleye
Mike Cazzola (F) – Fort Wayne Komets
Tylor Spink (F) – Toledo Walleye
Tyson Spink (F) – Toledo Walleye

See also 
2016 in sports
2017 in sports

References

External links
ECHL website

 
2016-17
3
3